The Open School of Journalism is an independent journalism school with branches in Berlin and New York City.

OSJ is a member of the Association for Education in Journalism and Mass Communication (AEJMC), the International Communication Association (ICA, sections Journalism Studies and Public Relations), and the Journalism Education Association (JEA).

Certificate in Journalism
OSJ offers a distance and online program in journalism with a recommended duration of one year which can be extended to two years. The course leads to a Certificate in Journalism according to ISCED Level 4.

The journalism program is authorized by the ZFU, a German state agency for distance education.

Curriculum
The curriculum can be personalized by selecting course modules based on the student's prior experience and occupational objectives.

The course offers modules in the following areas:
 Journalistic working techniques: investigation/research, interviews, writing style for print media, radio, TV, and online media).
 Areas of journalism: Arts journalism, Business journalism, Environmental journalism, Fashion journalism, Foreign affairs journalism, Medical journalism, Political journalism, Science journalism, Sports journalism, etc.
 Genres of Journalism: Advocacy journalism, Citizen journalism, Collaborative journalism, Comics journalism, Database journalism, Gonzo journalism, Immersion journalism, Investigative journalism, Literary journalism, Muckraking, Narrative journalism, New Journalism, Non-profit journalism, Peace journalism, Scientific journalism, Watchdog journalism, etc.
 Public Relations: Press Releases, News Conferences, Crisis PR, etc.
 Practical Workshops: Investigation, News writing, feature writing, opinion writing, Sub-editing, etc.

References

External links
 Official website

Journalism schools in Germany